Christian Schröder (born 10 January 1947) is a German sailor. He competed in the Finn event at the 1972 Summer Olympics.

References

External links
 

1947 births
Living people
German male sailors (sport)
Olympic sailors of East Germany
Sailors at the 1972 Summer Olympics – Finn
Sportspeople from Schwerin